

17th century – Colonial North America
 1622 - Indian massacre of 1622
 1637 - Pequot War
 1675 - King Philip's War
 1675 - Siege of Brookfield
 1675 - Attack on Springfield, October 5
 1676 - Attack on Sudbury, April 21
 1676 - Bacon's Rebellion, Sept 19, Rebels burn down colonial capital, Virginia Colony
 1677 - Culpeper's Rebellion, 1677–1678, Revolt against the ruling Lords Proprietors in Albemarle County, Province of Carolina, near what is now Elizabeth City, North Carolina
 1680 - Pueblo Revolt
 1689 - Cochecho Massacre, June 28
 1689 - Boston revolt, Angered Bostonians rose up against the royal governor, Edmund Andros, jailed him, and took control of the city.
 1689 - Leisler's Rebellion, 1689 to 1691, An uprising in lower New York against the policies of King James II of England, New York City

18th century – Colonial North America
 1711 - Cary's Rebellion
 1712 - New York Slave Revolt of 1712, April 6, New York City, New York
 1715 - Yamasee War
 1713 - Boston Bread Riot, Boston, Massachusetts
 1734 - Mast Tree Riot, Fremont, New Hampshire
 1737 - Boston Brothel Riot, Boston, Massachusetts
 1739 - Stono Rebellion, Slave rebellion., September, Province of South Carolina
 1741 - New York Slave Insurrection of 1741, New York City, New York
 1742 - Philadelphia Election Riot, Philadelphia, Pennsylvania
 1746 - New Jersey Tenant Riots, New Jersey
 1747 - Knowles Riot, Boston, Massachusetts (anti-impressment)
 1763 - Pontiac's War
 1764 - Paxton Riots, Pennsylvania
 1765 - War of the Regulation, 1765–1771, North Carolina
 1765 - Black Boys Rebellion, 1765 & 1769, Revolt against British policy regarding American Indians in western Pennsylvania. Conococheague Valley, colonial Pennsylvania
 1765 - Stamp Act 1765 riots, Protests and riots in Boston, later spread throughout the colonies, notably Rhode Island, Maryland, New York, Pennsylvania, North Carolina, and South Carolina.
 1768 - Liberty Riot, Boston (anti-impressment and anti-Townshend Acts)
 1770 - Boston Massacre, Boston, Massachusetts
 1771 - Battle of Alamance, Last battle of War of the Regulation, May 1771, Alamance, North Carolina
 1772 - Gaspee Affair, Rhode Island
 1772 - Pine Tree Riot, Weare, New Hampshire
 1773 - Boston Tea Party, Boston, Massachusetts
 1774 - The burning of the ship , October 19, 1774, The "Annapolis Tea Party", Action taken in Maryland to support the people in Boston following the Boston Tea Party, Annapolis, Maryland

See also
 Colonial history of the United States
 List of incidents of civil unrest in the United States
 List of massacres
 List of riots (notable incidents of civil disorder worldwide)
 List of strikes
 Timeline of labor issues and events

Colonial North America